St Nicholas' Church, Askham is a parish church in the Church of England in Askham, Nottinghamshire.

The church is Grade II* listed by the Department for Digital, Culture, Media and Sport as it is a particularly significant building of more than local interest.

History
The church is medieval, the south nave being 12th century but was restored in 1906 to 1907.

Parish structure
The church is in a group of parishes which includes
St Nicholas' Church, Askham
St Helen's Church, Grove
Church of St John the Baptist, East Markham
St Peter's Church, Headon-cum-Upton

Bells

The church has 3 bells which are hung dead on a steel frame with hammers.

See also
Grade II* listed buildings in Nottinghamshire
Listed buildings in Askham, Nottinghamshire

Sources

12th-century church buildings in England
Church of England church buildings in Nottinghamshire
Grade II* listed churches in Nottinghamshire